The 2005 Under 19 Rugby World Championship took place in South Africa between 1 April and 18 April 2005. South Africa won the final over New Zealand 20–15.

Pool/standings 
The IRB setting for this tournament was that the matches were to be played between two pools from which the top 4 teams qualified for the semifinals and the team that finished at the bottom of the Division A pool was to be relegated to the Division B.
Pool A played against Pool D
Pool B played against Pool C

Match points were awarded on the basis of 4 points for a Win, 2 points for a draw and 0 points for a Loss. Bonus points were awarded for teams scoring 4 tries or more and to losing teams who lost be 7 points or less.

Division A

Groups

Group phase

Knock out phase

9th-place play-off

5th-place play-off

1st-place play-off

Division B

Groups

Group phase

Knock out phase

9th-place play-off

5th-place play-off

1st-place play-off

Final standings 

* Georgia was demoted to Division B and Samoa promoted to Division A for next World Championship.

# Namibia, Zimbabwe, Russia, Spain, Chile, and Paraguay were relegated from Division B and had to enter regional competitions to qualify for next World Championship.

Sources 
 Official site

2005
2005 rugby union tournaments for national teams
International rugby union competitions hosted by South Africa
2005 in South African rugby union
Sports competitions in Durban
2005 in youth sport
Pietermaritzburg